Proserpinus terlooi, the Terloo sphinx moth, is a moth of the family Sphingidae first described by Henry Edwards in 1875. It is found from southern Arizona to Sonora in Mexico.

The wingspan is 42–48 mm. The forewing upperside is nearly uniformly grayish green with a darker green median band. The hindwing upperside has a reddish basal area and a grayish marginal band.

There is one generation per year with adults on wing in July and August. Adults fly during the very late afternoon or evening, nectaring from flowers.

The larvae feed on Boerhavia species (including Boerhavia coccinea and Boerhavia coulteri). There are at least three color morphs, ranging from very pale green to slightly darker green and a mottled brown and gray pattern.

References

Macroglossini
Moths described in 1875